Saad B. Omer is an American vaccinologist and infectious disease epidemiologist. He is the inaugural Director of the Yale Institute for Global Health. He is also a Professor of Medicine (Infectious Diseases) at Yale School of Medicine and the Susan Dwight Bliss Professor of Epidemiology of Microbial Diseases at Yale School of Public Health.

In 2009, he received the Maurice R. Hilleman Early-Stage Career Investigator Award from the National Foundation for Infectious Diseases. His research on vaccination rates, exemptions, and outbreaks of vaccine-preventable diseases has been widely covered in the media On March 5, 2019, he testified at a US Senate hearing on vaccines, stating that preventing the next potential resurgence of measles will require a broad-based federal response to improve vaccine access.

He has published widely in biomedical journals including the New England Journal of Medicine, JAMA, Lancet, Pediatrics, American Journal of Public Health, and Science. Moreover, he has written op-eds for publications such as the New York Times, Politico, and the Washington Post.

References

External links

Faculty page
Omer Research Group website

Living people
American epidemiologists
Vaccinologists
Emory University School of Medicine faculty
Emory University faculty
American public health doctors
Year of birth missing (living people)